VPNFilter is malware designed to infect routers and certain network attached storage devices. As of 24 May 2018, it is estimated to have infected approximately 500,000 routers worldwide, though the number of at-risk devices is larger. It can steal data, contains a "kill switch" designed to disable the infected router on command, and is able to persist should the user reboot the router. The FBI believes that it was created by the Russian Fancy Bear group. The FBI later announced that they believe that Fancy Bear and Sandworm (also known as Voodoo Bear) are the same group. In February 2022, the CISA announced that a new malware called Cyclops Blink produced by Sandworm had replaced VPNFilter.

Operation

VPNFilter is malware infecting a number of different kinds of network routers and storage devices.  It seems to be designed in part to target serial networking devices using the Modbus protocol to talk to and control industrial hardware, as in factories and warehouses. The malware has special, dedicated code to target control systems using SCADA.

The initial infection vector is still unknown.  The Cisco Talos security group hypothesizes the malware exploits known router security vulnerabilities to infect devices.

This software installs itself in multiple stages:
 Stage 1 involves a worm which adds code to the device's crontab (the list of tasks run at regular intervals by the cron scheduler on Linux). This allows it to remain on the device after a reboot, and to re-infect it with the subsequent stages if they are removed.  Stage 1 uses known URLs to find and install Stage 2 malware.  If those known URLs are disabled, Stage 1 sets up a socket listener on the device and waits to be contacted by command and control systems.
 Stage 2 is the body of the malware, including the basic code that carries out all normal functions and executes any instructions requested by special, optional Stage 3 modules.
 Stage 3 can be any of various "modules" that tell the malware to do specific things, like sniffing network data, gathering credentials, serving as a relay point to hide the origin of subsequent attacks, or collecting data on industrial control devices (Modbus SCADA). Any exfiltrated data can then be encrypted via the Tor network.

Mitigation 

Both Cisco and Symantec suggest that people who own affected devices do a factory reset. That is typically accomplished by using a small, pointed object, such as a straightened out paperclip, to push the small reset button on the back on the unit for 10 to 30 seconds (time varies by model). This will remove the malware, but also restores the router to all original settings.  If the router has remote management enabled, a factory reset will often disable this (the default setting of many routers).  Remote management is thought to be one possible vector for the initial attack.

Before connecting the factory-reset router to the internet again, the device's default passwords should be changed to prevent reinfection.

Devices at risk

The initial worm that installs VPNFilter can only attack devices running embedded firmware based on Busybox on Linux compiled only for specific processors.  This does not include non-embedded Linux devices such as workstations and servers.

Manufacturer-provided firmware on the following router models is known to be at risk:

 Asus
RT-AX92U
RT-AC66U
 RT-N10
 RT-N10E
 RT-N10U
 RT-N56U
 RT-N66U
 D-Link
 DES-1210-08P
 DIR-300
 DIR-300A
 DSR-250N
 DSR-500N
 DSR-1000
 DSR-1000N
 Huawei
 HG8245
 Linksys
 E1200
 E2500
 E3000
 E3200
 E4200
 RV082
 WRVS4400N
 Mikrotik
 CCR1009
 CCR1016
 CCR1036
 CCR1072
 CRS109
 CRS112
 CRS125
 RB411
 RB450
 RB750
 RB911
 RB921
 RB941
 RB951
 RB952
 RB960
 RB962
 RB1100
 RB1200
 RB2011
 RB3011
 RB Groove
 RB Omnitik
 STX5
 Mikrotik RouterOS versions up to 6.38.5 on current or 6.37.5 on bugfix release chains
 Netgear
 DG834
 DGN1000
 DGN2200
 DGN3500
 FVS318N
 MBRN3000
 R6400
 R7000
 R8000
 WNR1000
 WNR2000
 WNR2200
 WNR4000
 WNDR3700
 WNDR4000
 WNDR4300
 WNDR4300-TN
 UTM50
 QNAP
 TS251
 TS439 Pro
 Other QNAP NAS devices running QTS software
 TP-Link
 R600VPN
 TL-WR741ND
 TL-WR841N
 Ubiquiti
 NSM2
 PBE M5
 Upvel
 Unknown Models 
 ZTE
 ZXHN H108N

Epidemiology
VPNFilter is described by Cisco Talos as having infected as many as 500,000 devices worldwide, in perhaps 54 different countries, though proportionately the focus has been on Ukraine.

FBI investigation

The FBI has taken a high-profile role in addressing this malware, conducting an investigation that resulted in the seizure of the domain name toknowall.com as ostensibly having been used to redirect queries from stage 1 of the malware, allowing it to locate and install copies of stages 2 and 3.  The US Justice Department also compelled the site Photobucket to disable known URLs used to distribute malware Stage 2.

FBI recommendation on removing the infection

On 25 May 2018, the FBI recommended that users reboot their at-risk devices. This would temporarily remove the stages 2 and 3 of the malware.  Stage 1 would remain, leading the router to try re-downloading the payload and infecting the router again.  However, prior to the recommendation the US Justice Department seized web endpoints the malware uses for Stage 2 installation.

Without these URLs, the malware must rely on the fallback socket listener for Stage 2 installation.  This method requires threat actor command and control systems to contact each system to install Stage 2, increasing the threat actor's risk of being identified.  The FBI further recommended users disable remote management on their devices and update the firmware.  A firmware update removes all stages of the malware, though it is possible the device could be reinfected.

The FBI said that this would help them to find the servers distributing the payload.

Notes

References

See also
 Cyclops Blink

Exploit-based worms
2018 in technology